Misool, formerly spelled Mysol (Dutch: Misoöl) or Misol, is one of the four major islands in the Raja Ampat Islands in Southwest Papua, Indonesia. Its area is 2,034 km2. The highest point is 561 m and the main towns are Waigama, located on the island's northwest coast, and Lilinta on the island's southeast coast.

The inhabitants speak the Ma'ya language, Biga language and Matbat language, as well as Indonesian and its dialect, Papuan Malay.

Other main islands of this group off the western end of Southwest Papua are Salawati, Batanta and Waigeo, and there are numerous smaller islands such as Kofiau.

Etymology
The name Misool is from Ma'ya language which meant port or harbour relating to when the first king from Waigeo arrived on the island. Original inhabitants (Matbat) called the island with the name Batan Me.

Ecology

Terrestrial

Misool is part of the Vogelkop–Aru lowland rain forests ecoregion, which includes the other Raja Ampat Islands and the Bird's Head Peninsula on mainland New Guinea. Plant communities include alluvial, or lowland alluvial rain forest and lowland hill rain forest. Native animals include marsupials, murid rodents, bats, and many birds, including several endemic species. Some native animals include:
 Echymipera kalubu, common spiny bandicoot
 Echymipera rufescens
 Dorcopsis muelleri
 Phalanger orientalis
 Spilocuscus maculatus
 Petaurus breviceps
 Macroglossus minimus
 Nyctimene aello
 Pteropus conspicillatus
 Aselliscus tricuspidatus
 Pipistrellus papuanus
 Lesser bird-of-paradise (Paradisaea minor)

Marine
Misool and the Raja Ampat Islands are part of the Coral Triangle, and islands' coral reefs and coastal waters are some of the most biodiverse on Earth. Native fish include the Misool rainbowfish (Melanotaenia misoolensis) and Misool yellowfin rainbowfish (Melanotaenia flavipinnis). A section of Raja Ampat Marine Recreation Park covers the coastal waters southeast of the island. The park was designated in 2009.

History
Islam first arrived in the Raja Ampat archipelago in the 15th century due to political and economic contacts with the Bacan Sultanate. During the 16th and 17th centuries, the Sultanate of Tidore had close economic ties with the island, which was ruled by king in Lilinta descended from Gurabesi of Waigeo, while Tidore appointed another king in Waigama. During this period, Islam became firmly established and local chiefs had begun adopting Islam.

Misool was a part of the Dutch colonial empire under the Netherlands East Indies administration. The Japanese occupied the island in 1942, became the base of Imperial Japanese Navy until 1945.

Pulau Misool Nature Reserve

Pulau Misool Nature Reserve was established in 1982. It covers the southern portion of the island, with an area of 840 km2.

References

External links
 
 Jelle Miedema, Perspectives on the Bird's Head of Irian Jaya, Indonesia: Proceedings of the Conference Leiden, 13–17 October 1997  
 Indonesia Field Project - Misool - Marine Conservation Agreements

Raja Ampat Islands
Islands of Indonesia
Islands of Oceania
Uninhabited islands of Indonesia